Forensic astronomy is the use of astronomy, the scientific study of celestial objects, to determine the appearance of the sky at specific times in the past. This has been used, if relatively rarely, in forensic science (that is, for solving problems of relevance to the legal system) and for resolving historical problems more generally, notably issues in art history.

Forensic science
As a forensic science in the strict sense of the term, astronomical knowledge can help resolve certain legal questions. In one reported instance, an astronomer testified in court as an expert witness as to whether a newly built house would cast a shadow on another house. More generally, questions about the sun's or moon's placement in the sky at certain times of day or night may be legally relevant, such as for determining the date on which a  photograph was made. It has for instance been reported that Abraham Lincoln once successfully defended a legal case by describing the location of the Moon on the night of the offense.

History

By extension, the adjective "forensic" has come to be used for any detailed analysis of past events, whether related to legal questions or not, and so the determination of past celestial constellations more generally is now increasingly referred to as "forensic astronomy".

For research in art history, in particular, methods of astronomy are sometimes useful for determining the place and time of creation of a particular work of art, or of the event that inspired it. Such methods have for instance been used to date Vincent van Gogh's painting Evening Landscape with Rising Moon (to 9:08 pm, 13 July 1889), and to identify the meteors described in Walt Whitman's poem Year of Meteors (1859-60) – in conjunction with Frederic Edwin Church's painting of the same event (at right) – as the meteor procession of 1860.

See also
 Forensic meteorology
 Archeoastronomy
 Astronomical chronology

References

External links
 Smithsonian Magazine: Forensic Astronomer Solves Fine Arts Puzzles

Astronomy
Astronomical sub-disciplines
Art history